At the start of 1958, Billboard magazine published two charts specifically covering the top-performing songs in the United States in rhythm and blues (R&B) and related African-American-oriented music genres.  The R&B Best Sellers in Stores chart ranked records based on their "current national selling importance at the retail level", based on a survey of record retailers "with a high volume of sales in rhythm and blues records".  The Most Played R&B by Jockeys chart ranked songs based on the "number of plays on disk jockey radio shows" according to a weekly survey of "top disk jockey shows in all key markets".  With effect from the October 20 issue of Billboard, the magazine discontinued both charts and combined sales and airplay into one chart called Hot R&B Sides, which has been continuously published since that date, since 2005 under the title Hot R&B/Hip-Hop Songs.

In the issue of Billboard dated January 6, Danny & the Juniors were at number one on the Best Sellers chart with "At the Hop" and Ernie Freeman held the top spot on the Jockeys chart with "Raunchy".  Two weeks later, Freeman's single was replaced at number one by Bill Justis's recording of the same tune.  The two versions of "Raunchy" were among nine songs which reached number one on the Jockeys chart but failed to top the Best Sellers listing.  Conversely, four singles which reached the peak position on the sales chart did not top the airplay-based listing.  "Yakety Yak" by the Coasters had the year's longest unbroken run at number one on the Best Sellers chart, spending six consecutive weeks in the top spot.  The Silhouettes had the longest uninterrupted run atop the Jockeys chart, spending six weeks in the peak position with "Get a Job"; "Yakety Yak" also spent six weeks at number one on that listing, but not consecutively.

Elvis Presley, known as the "King of Rock and Roll", gained his final R&B number one in 1958 when "Wear My Ring Around Your Neck" topped the Jockeys chart.  Presley had achieved several R&B number ones over the preceding two years, but as his music moved away from his rock and roll roots and into more sedate directions in the early 1960s he would experience less success on the R&B chart, and after 1963 he would not enter the listing again.  In contrast to Presley's lengthy and hugely successful career, both the Silhouettes and the Elegants reached number one in 1958 with the only singles of their respective careers to enter any of Billboards charts: both the former group's "Get a Job" and the latter's "Little Star" topped both R&B charts as well as the magazine's pop listings, but neither of the two doo-wop groups would ever chart again.  Justis, Pérez Prado, and the Kalin Twins also reached number one in 1958 with their only R&B chart entries, although they did place other songs in the pop charts.  The final number one on the Best Sellers chart was "It's All in the Game" by Tommy Edwards, and the last chart-topper on the Jockeys listing was Bobby Day's "Rock-in-Robin".  The following week, Day's song became the first number one on the combined Hot R&B Sides chart.  The year's final R&B chart-topper was "Lonely Teardrops" by Jackie Wilson, which reached the peak position in the issue of Billboard dated December 15 and stayed there for the remainder of the year.

Chart history

R&B Best Sellers in Stores and R&B Most Played by Jockeys

Hot R&B Sides

References

Works cited

1958
1958 record charts
1958 in American music